Mere Mehboob ("My Lover") is a 1963 Indian film directed by Harnam Singh Rawail and starring Ashok Kumar, Rajendra Kumar, Sadhana, Nimmi, Pran, Johnny Walker and Ameeta. The film became a blockbuster and took the number one position at the box office in 1963. A Muslim social film, it drew a background from Aligarh Muslim University, Aligarh and traditional Lucknow. The famous song "Mere Mehboob Tujhe Mere" was shot in the University Hall and in a couple of places, one gets to see the University. The opening scene of the movie shows the famous residential hall and the associated clock tower; "Victoria Gate".

Plot
While studying in Aligarh Muslim University, Anwar Hussain Anwar falls in love with a veiled woman and is unable to get her out of his mind. En route to Lucknow, they meet with Nawab Buland Akhtar Changezi, and subsequently meet with him a few days later so that he can use his influence to secure an editor's job for Anwar with a magazine. Nawab then asks Anwar to teach his sister, Husna, some poetry, to which he agrees, and eventually finds that she is the very same veiled woman. Both fall in love with each other and the Nawab approves of this alliance, even though Anwar lives a poor lifestyle. The formal engagement ceremony takes place and arrangements are made for the wedding to take place soon. The heavily indebted Nawab does not realize that soon he will find Anwar in the company of a lowly courtesan, Najma; and pressure will be brought on him to get Husna to marry wealthy Munne Raja - who is all set to auction the former's mansion as well as belongings. But at the end Husna marries Anwar Hussain and Nawab recovers his along with all the belongings.

Cast & Characters

Music

The soundtrack for the movie was composed by Naushad with lyrics by Shakeel Badayuni. The soundtrack consists of 9 songs, featuring vocals by Mohammed Rafi, Lata Mangeshkar and Asha Bhosle. The song Mere Mehboob Tujhe became very popular upon release.

Song list

Box office

Awards and nominations
National Film Awards
 1963: Certificate of Merit for the Second Best Feature Film in Hindi
Filmfare Awards
Filmfare Best Art Direction Award-Sudhendu Roy
Filmfare Nomination for Best Supporting Actor-Johnny Walker
Filmfare Nomination for Best Supporting Actress-Ameeta
Filmfare Nomination for Best Supporting Actress-Nimmi
Filmfare Nomination for Best Music Director-Naushad
Filmfare Nomination for Best Lyricist-Shakeel Badayuni for the song "Mere Mehboob Tujhe Mere"
Filmfare Nomination for Best Playback Singer-Mohd. Rafi for the song "Mere Mehboob Tujhe Mere"

References

External links
 

1963 films
1960s Hindi-language films
1960s Urdu-language films
Films set in Uttar Pradesh
Films directed by H. S. Rawail
Films scored by Naushad
Films shot in Uttar Pradesh
Films shot in Lucknow
Films set in Lucknow
Aligarh Muslim University